Digrammia nubiculata is a species of geometrid moth in the family Geometridae. It is found in North America.

The MONA number for Digrammia nubiculata is 910784 & Hodges number for Digrammia nubiculata is 6371.

References

Further reading

External links

 

Macariini
Articles created by Qbugbot
Moths described in 1876